Iviva is a genus of leaf beetles in the subfamily Eumolpinae. It is distributed in New Guinea, and it is named after the type locality of the type species, Lake Iviva (Sirunki), in the Western Highlands province of Papua New Guinea.

Species
 Iviva antennata Medvedev, 2009
 Iviva coccinelloides Gressitt, 1969
 Iviva diversipunctata Medvedev, 2009
 Iviva striata Medvedev, 2009

References

Eumolpinae
Chrysomelidae genera
Beetles of Oceania
Insects of New Guinea
Endemic fauna of New Guinea